Otitoma deluta is a species of sea snail, a marine gastropod mollusk in the family Pseudomelatomidae, the turrids and allies.

Description
The length of the shell varies between 6 mm and 8 mm.

Distribution
This marine species occurs in the South China Sea and off the Philippines

References

 Gould 1860, Proc. Boston Soc. Nat. Hist. 7: 339
 Wiedrick S.G. (2014). Review of the genera Otitoma Jousseaume, 1880 and Thelecytharella with the description of two new species Gastropoda: Conoidea: Pseudomelatomidae) from the southwest Pacific Ocean. The Festivus. 46(3): 40-53

External links
 
 Gastropods.com: Otitoma deluta

deluta
Gastropods described in 2017